WMRS Radio went on the air in March 1989 filling a void left by Power 95 formerly WVTL when WVTL left the Monticello, Indiana community in the mid 1980s. WMRS plays music of the 1970s, 1980s, 1990s, and today. 

WMRS is the home of Super Trading Post and, during the Summer season, "TGIF" Pool Party Friday. WMRS Radio has won five Crystal Communicator Awards of Excellence for its sports broadcasts. 

WMRS/Sunny 107.7 FM was awarded Station of the Year honors during the Indiana Broadcasters Association 19th Annual Spectrum Awards in market 3. WMRS Radio provides the area with up-to-the-minute local news, sports, weather, and national news at the top of nearly every hour. 

Radio sponsors the Monticello citywide Holiday Treasure Hunt, a Turkey giveaway, a Christmas Tree giveaway, a Mother's Day Contest, the Touch of Elegance Bridal Show, and the Lakes Area Home and Garden Show and broadcasts live at www.wmrsradio.com.

References

External links

MRS
Mass media in White County, Indiana
Radio stations established in 1989
1989 establishments in Indiana